The Cat Came Back is a 1988 Canadian animated short film by Cordell Barker, produced by fellow award-winning animator Richard Condie in Winnipeg for the National Film Board of Canada. It is based on the children's song "The Cat Came Back" by Harry S. Miller. It was in theaters with Touchstone's Who Framed Roger Rabbit.

In May 2017, the NFB and Canadian publisher Firefly Books adapted the film as a children's book.

Plot
The film portrays the increasingly desperate efforts of the elderly Mr. Johnson to rid himself of a small yet extremely troublesome yellow cat that will not leave his home. He first tries to leave the cat in the woods only to get lost himself. An attempt to drown it at sea ends in him nearly drowning. He then tries to send the cat away in a hot air balloon, but winds up getting dragged into the sky himself when he cuts the balloon free. For his fourth attempt, Mr. Johnson tries to take it away on a pump trolley, running over many damsels in distress and even a cow tied to the train tracks until he hits a bug crossing the railroad track, causing the trolley to jump the rails and send him plummeting into an abandoned mine where he is attacked by rats, snakes and bats. Not only does the cat find its way back each time, but it becomes increasingly destructive after each attempt until Mr. Johnson finally has enough and tries to blow up the cat with a large pile of dynamite only to blow himself up instead when he accidentally lights his hair on fire. Thinking himself finally rid of the cat, Mr. Johnson's spirit proceeds to tease his foe when his human remains fall on top of it, killing it and releasing all nine of its lives to bedevil Mr. Johnson for all eternity.

Voice cast 
 Richard Condie as Mr. Johnson

Reception and legacy
The film garnered over 15 awards, including a Genie Award for Best Animated Short, as well as an Academy Award nomination, but lost to the Pixar short Tin Toy. It was also chosen for inclusion in animation historian Jerry Beck's 50 Greatest Cartoons, placing at #32. It was also included in the Animation Show of Shows.

Mr. Johnson and the cat were later used in two adverts for Hula Hoops, with one of the ads having to been found surfacing on YouTube.

References

External links

 
 
 Article on the book of the movie (alongside an adaptation of Toril Kove's My Grandmother Ironed the King's Shirts) on Quill & Quire

1988 short films
Canadian animated short films
Films based on songs
Films directed by Cordell Barker
National Film Board of Canada animated short films
Best Animated Short Film Genie and Canadian Screen Award winners
Canadian comedy short films
1980s animated short films
1988 animated films
Animated musical films
Canadian musical comedy films
Animated films about cats
Quebec films
English-language Canadian films
1980s English-language films
1980s Canadian films
National Film Board of Canada short films
Films about old age